is a professional Go player.

Biography
Katsunori became a professional in 1992. He was promoted to 8 dan in 2002.

Promotion record

Trivia 
 On Pandanet he plays as Yanaka

References

External links
 Nihon Ki-in profile 

1971 births
Japanese Go players
Living people